Hassall Grove is a suburb of Sydney, in the state of New South Wales, Australia. Hassall Grove is located 46 kilometres west of the Sydney central business district, in the local government area of the City of Blacktown and is part of the Greater Western Sydney region.

History 
Thomas Hassall (1794–1868) a clergyman, grazier and magistrate, arrived in the colony with his family in 1798 and they settled at Camden. Thomas Hassall married Anne, the eldest daughter of Reverend Samuel Marsden and their sons James Samuel and Rowland were amongst the earliest students at The King's School at Parramatta. Thomas Hassall started the first Sunday school in Australia in 1813.

Hassall Grove was named to honour Rowland Hassall (1768–1820), who was associated with the area as a Church of England Minister. He also acted as agent for the estates of Phillip Parker King and managed Samuel Marsden’s properties in his absence.

Population 
According to the 2016 census of Population, there were  4,505 people in Hassall Grove.
 Aboriginal and Torres Strait Islander people made up 3.1% of the population. 
 58.4% of people were born in Australia. The next most common countries of birth were Philippines 9.2%, Fiji 3.1%, New Zealand 2.9% and India 2.8%.   
 55.8% of people spoke only English at home. Other languages spoken at home included Arabic 7.4%, Tagalog 6.6%, Hindi 3.9% and Urdu 2.4%. 
 The most common responses for religion were Catholic 35.2%, No Religion 14.0%, Anglican 10.5% and Islam 8.0%.
 This suburb had a young population, with a median age of 30 and children aged 0–14 years making up 24.3% of the population.

References 

Suburbs of Sydney
City of Blacktown